Philippine Chen Kuang High School (PCKHS) is a private school with English, Filipino, and Chinese language classes.  PCKHS is located at 210 P. Parada Street, Brgy. Santa Lucia, San Juan, Metro Manila.  PCKHS is a non-stock, non-profit school.  Effective SY 2015–2016, the principal is Mr. Steve Christopher Wong.

Chinese-language schools in Metro Manila
Schools in San Juan, Metro Manila
Educational institutions with year of establishment missing